may refer to:

Daiki Sato (footballer, born 1988) (1988–2010), Japanese footballer
Daiki Sato (footballer, born 1999), Japanese footballer, currently playing for Machida Zelvia